The 1922 Tipperary Senior Hurling Championship was the 31st staging of the Tipperary Senior Hurling Championship since its establishment by the Tipperary County Board in 1887, held after a two-year hiatus.

Toomevara were the defending champions.

Boherlahan won the championship after a 5-01 to 2-03 defeat of a North Selection in the final. It was their fifth  championship title overall and their first title since 1919.

References

Tipperary
Tipperary Senior Hurling Championship